The Bombo shooting was a mass murder that occurred in Bombo, Uganda on March 9, 2013. The perpetrator, Patrick Okot Odoch, a private in the Uganda People's Defence Force, shot and killed nine people in a bar and, while fleeing, a tenth victim. Odoch fled and was arrested ten days later, and was charged with murder and attempted murder. On June 4, Odoch was found guilty of murder and sentenced to 90 years imprisonment.

Background
On March 5, 2013, a combined group of army deserters and assorted armed criminals attacked the Mbuya barracks belonging to the Uganda People's Defence Force (UPDF) on March 5, 2013, to steal the weapons located there. 

Patrick Okot Odoch, a private in the UPDF who had a history of poor behavior and previously had been arrested for consuming bhang, was attached to the nearby Bombo barracks. Inspired by the chaos at the Mbuya barracks, on the following night of March 6, Odoch had wanted to rape Grace Chandiru, the 14-year-old daughter of his commander, Sergeant Onesmus Odule. Odoch saw Grace at the Yumbe Boys' Bar in Pakele, a bar frequented by local military personnel and their families, and attempted to rape her. Odoch fled when Grace raised alarm, prompting her father Sergeant Odule to report the incident to police on the next day, March 7, for which Odoch promised revenge.

Odoch entered the bar, locked the doors, before opening them again and leaving, probably planning his shooting. Odoch entered the bar again the next day at 9p.m. while the Odules were present, this time with a colleague, however the owner told him to drink somewhere else, referring him to the incident that occurred on March 7.

Shooting 
During the night of March 8, while Odoch was on duty as part of the 23rd Air Defence Regiment, he deserted his post armed with an AK-47 assault rifle and 30 rounds of ammunition. Upon entering the bar on March 9 at 12:12am, Odoch opened fire on the people present, killing Sergeant Odule, his wife Florence, the owner of the bar Amina Aseru, as well as four other soldiers and two civilians, while two people were wounded. Odoch then left and went towards Gogonya, about a mile (1.5 km) from the bar, where he killed another person. Before finally fleeing he also robbed Halima Lukiya, stealing her hand bag, a mobile phone, and USh  in cash.

Nine of his victims died on the spot, while David Komakech died one hour later from excessive loss of blood. There were 23 spent rounds recovered by police from the crime scene.

Victims

Wounded were Joyce Asiyo, 44, and Ismail Akbar, 14, son of Amina Aseru. Reportedly Sgt. Francis Ogugu was also injured.

After the shooting the army offered every family of the victims  in condolence and for burial arrangements, as well as coffins and transportation of the dead to their ancestral homes.

Arrest and conviction 
Following the shooting, security measures were tightened, and all army deserters in the area were ordered to leave, or they would risk arrest. Also a night curfew was imposed, forcing all businesses to close at 10pm, and limiting movement from 11pm onward.

Joint forces of the police and the army searched for Odoch, and laid traps to capture him. The search operations resulted in the finding of Odoch's uniform on March 10, and on March 14 of the rifle used in the shooting, which was recovered near a factory in Nakatonya Village in Nyimbwa Sub-county and was still loaded with three rounds. When Odoch called his colleagues to ask for financial help, investigators managed to track his mobile phone. He was arrested between March 18 and March 19 at Abere Trading Centre in Ngai Sub-county in Oyam District, brought to the army barracks in Lira and charged with murder, attempted murder, misuse of a firearm, aggravated robbery, and failing to protect war materials, before being transferred back to Bombo, where he was held to be court-martialed in a public trial.  

After denying all charges raised against him, Odoch was put in remand at Makindye Military Prison until April 17. Preliminary hearings for the case began on April 22 at Bombo Town Health Centre. The maximum punishment Odoch is facing for the crime is a death sentence.

See also
Kampala wedding massacre
Kamwenge Trading Centre shooting
List of massacres in Uganda
Human rights in Uganda

References

External links
Bombo killings: Four testify against soldier, Daily Monitor (April 23, 2013)
Bombo shooting: Army court denies soldier bail, Daily Monitor (April 24, 2013)
Bombo killings: Court adjourns public hearing, Daily Monitor (April 26, 2013)
Bombo killer faces 12 witnesses, The Observer (April 26, 2013)
UPDF soldier on trial for killing 10 people, New Vision (April 22, 2013)
Angry Mob Crave For Bombo Murderer's Flesh, NBS (April 22, 2013)
Bombo Court: More Witnesses Pin Soldier, NBS (April 23, 2013)
Bomb Court Martial: More witnesses pin Private Okot Odoch, NBS (April 23, 2013)
Witness: I Saw PTE. Odoch Shoot My Friend Dead, NBS (April 23, 2013)
Bombo murder suspect in court today, KFM (April 22, 2013)
Trial of Bombo shooting suspect kicks off, KFM (April 22, 2013)
UPDF soldier denied bail, trial continues tomorrow, KFM (April 22, 2013)

2013 crimes in Uganda
Mass murder in 2013
Spree shootings in Uganda
Luweero District
March 2013 events in Africa
2010s murders in Uganda